Vuarnet is a brand of sunglasses that is owned by French manufacturer Sporoptic Pouilloux S.A. The sunglasses were developed from the invention of the Skilynx lens in 1957 by French opticians Roger Pouilloux and Joseph Hatchiguian.

The sunglasses were originally marketed under the name 'Skilynx Acier', and they were provided to the French Ski Team. After Jean Vuarnet, a French alpine ski racer, won the gold medal in the Downhill at the 1960 Winter Olympics, an agreement was reached in 1961 to market the sunglasses using his surname as the brand name.

The company was an official corporate sponsor of the 1984 Summer Olympics in Los Angeles.

References

External links

Eyewear brands of France
French brands
Eyewear companies of France